Thierry Roger Marc Détant (born 23 November 1965) competed as a track cyclist for the Netherlands at the 1988 Summer Olympics. Born in Amsterdam, he participated in the men's 1 km time trial, finishing 18th.

See also
 List of Dutch Olympic cyclists
 List of people from Amsterdam

References

1965 births
Living people
Dutch male cyclists
Olympic cyclists of the Netherlands
Cyclists at the 1988 Summer Olympics
Cyclists from Amsterdam